Lewis Phife (1841 – 1913) was a U.S. Cavalry soldier. He received the Medal of Honor for gallantry in action against Apache Indians in the Arizona Territory. 
Phife left his hometown of Burlington, Iowa at the age of 19 to move westward. He settled in Marion County, Oregon and in 1865 volunteered for service with Company F of the 1st Oregon Volunteer Infantry. At the conclusion of the Civil War he enlisted in the Regular Army.

Medal of Honor citation
The President of the United States of America, in the name of Congress, takes pleasure in presenting the Medal of Honor to Sergeant Lewis Phife, United States Army, for bravery in scouts and actions against Indians from August to October 1868, while serving with Company B, 8th U.S. Cavalry, in action in Arizona Territory.

The Medal was awarded on July 24, 1869.

See also
List of Medal of Honor recipients
List of Medal of Honor recipients for the Indian Wars

External links
Military Times Hall of Valor
Lewis Phife on Findagrave

References

1841 births
1913 deaths
United States Army Medal of Honor recipients
People of Iowa in the American Civil War
People of Oregon in the American Civil War
United States Army soldiers
American Indian Wars recipients of the Medal of Honor
People from Marion County, Oregon